Kyle Alan John Mullica (born July 31, 1986) is an American politician who is a Democratic member of the Colorado Senate. He represents District 24, which includes the Adams County communities of Thornton, Federal Heights, Todd Creek and Northglenn. Previously, Mullica served in the Colorado House of Representatives and represented the 34th district in Adams County.

Political career

Election
Mullica was elected in the general election on November 6, 2018, winning 60 percent of the vote over 40 percent of Republican candidate Alex Winkler.

State Senate candidacy
In November 2021, Mullica, an emergency room nurse, announced he was running for the open Senate District 24 seat that, after redistricting, will cover much of Adams County, including his hometown of Thornton. In the 2022 election, Mullica won the race with over 54% of the vote.

References

Mullica, Kyle
Democratic Party Colorado state senators
Nurses from Colorado
Living people
21st-century American politicians
1986 births